Weeks Falls is a waterfall on the south fork of the Snoqualmie River, located near North Bend, Washington, USA, just south of Interstate 90 at exit 38. The falls are at the end of the road that goes past the Olallie State Park ranger headquarters. From the gravel parking lot, there is a paved accessible overlook to see the falls and a small area around the hydro-electric plant. There is also a ¼ mile accessible interpretive trail nearby.

Weeks Falls has a small hydroelectric plant operated by CHI West which generates about 4.3 Megawatts peak. It is unusual because it operates without a dam. Instead, water is being drawn from the river above the falls and run down an underground channel to the generation unit at the bottom of Weeks Falls.

See also

 Olallie State Park
 Upper Weeks Falls
 Snoqualmie River
 Damless hydro

References

Waterfalls of King County, Washington
Waterfalls of Washington (state)
Hydroelectric power plants in Washington (state)